Moscow Kremlin Museums (Russian Музеи Московского Кремля, MMK or Государственный историко-культурный музей-заповедник «Московский Кремль») is a major state-run museum in Moscow Kremlin. Its roots lie in the Kremlin Armoury museum founded in 1806, the current form of the museum started in 1991. The Head of the museum (since 2001) is Yelena Gagarina, daughter of cosmonaut Yuri Gagarin. There were 424,922 visitors to the Kremlin Museums in 2020, a drop of 86 percent from 2019 due to the COVID-19 pandemic, but it still ranked 46th on the List of most-visited art museums in the world in 2020.

Moscow Kremlin Museums have the following parts: 
 Kremlin Armoury (Оружейная палата)
 Diamond Fund (Алмазный фонд)
 Dormition Cathedral (Успенский Собор)
 Cathedral of the Archangel (Архангельский собор)
 Cathedral of the Annunciation (Благовещенский собор)
 Residence of Patriarchs and Church of the Twelve Apostles (Патриарший дворец и церковь Двенадцати апостолов)
 Church of the Deposition of the Robe (Церковь Ризоположения)
 Ivan the Great Bell Tower (Колокольня Ивана Великого)

History 
The Moscow Kremlin State Historical and Cultural Museum and Heritage Site consists of the Armoury Chamber and Cathedral Square. Within Cathedral Square is Assumption, Archangel and Annunciation cathedral, the Church of Laying Our Lady's Holy Robe, the Patriarch's Palace with the Twelve Apostles’ Church and the ‘Ivan the Great’ Bell Tower complex, as well as the exhibition halls in the Assumption Belfry and in on the One-Pillar Chamber of the Patriarch Palace.

During Napoleon's invasion of Russia, the staff of the Kremlin Museum took it upon themselves to preserve the museum's collections. During the invasion, many cultural objects were damaged, ruined, lost or relocated. The duties performed by the staff initiated the State Armoury Chamber as a national-historical museum.

The museum's first exposition was open to visitors in 1814. Emperor Nicholas I changed the name of the museum to “The Moscow Armoury Chambers on the August 22, 1831.

Structures

Armoury Chamber 
The Armoury Chamber is part of the Grand Kremlin Palace's complex. It is in the building contracted by architect Konstantin Ton in 1851. The Armoury stores the bases of the museum collections. It preserves ancient state regalia, ceremonial royal clothes and coronation dresses, vestments of Russian Orthodox Church hierarchs, the most extensive collection of gold and silverware made by Russian craftsman, West European artistic silver, ceremonial arms and armor, carriages and horse ceremonial harnesses. The Armoury holds more than four thousand items from Russia, European and Easters countries from the 4th – early 20th century.

Assumption Cathedral 
The Assumption Cathedral is in Cathedral Square where it is surrounded by Old Russian architecture: cathedrals and churches, the Ivan the Great Bell-Tower, the Facets Palace and the Patriarch's Palace. The cathedral is dedicated to the Feast of the Dormition of the Theotokos and Ever-Virgin Mary and was built as the principal church of the Russian state. In 1326, the first Moscow Metropolitan Peter ordered the quarters to be relocated from Vladimir to Moscow. A new building was constructed in 1479 by decree of Grand Prince of Russia Ivan III where architect Aristotele Fioravanti of Bologna was invited to design and build it.

For six centuries, the Assumption Cathedral has been the national and religious center of Russia: Tsars and Emperors were crowned there. The cathedral became a burial place for Russian Holy Hierarchs of the 14th–17th centuries. There are shrines with the relics of Moscow wonder workers Peter, Jonah, Philip, and Hermogenes in the cathedral.

The Assumption Cathedral surpassed all earlier churches both in size and grandeur of its interior. Its walls are filled with murals by outstanding painters from around the world and eventually it was filled with a unique collection of Russian medieval art monuments. 
After the Revolution of 1917, the Assumption church became a museum. Divine services were resumed in the cathedral in 1990.

Archangel Cathedral 
The Archangel Cathedral was constructed from 1505 to 1508 by Italian Architect Aloisio Novyi and is noted as the most unique monument in the whole ensemble of the Cathedral Square of the Moscow Kremlin. The cathedral was built to signify the end of Mongol rule and the strength of the grand princes of Russia. The cathedral is dedicated to the Archangel Michael, the patron saint of princes in the feats of arms. Grand princes used to go there to pray before leaving for war and younger brother of princes swore an oath of loyalty to grand princes here. Later, tsars would pay respects to their ancestors after a coronation ceremony at the cathedral.

Annunciation Cathedral 
The Annunciation Cathedral was built in 1484-1489 during the reign of the Sovereign of All Russia Ivan III. Unlike the other new residence building in the Kremlin, the Annunciation Cathedral was built by Pskov architects rather than Italian architects. It holds features of both Moscow and Pskov architectural traditions.
The cathedral was consecrated in honor of the Annunciation Day devoted to the announcement by the Archangel Gabriel to the Virgin Mary that she was going to give birth to the son of God. 
In 1508, on decree of Great Prince Vasily Ivanovich, the domes were gilded, and the icons of the iconostasis were covered with silver, gold and glass beads. Tsar Ivan IV the Terrible added four small side churches at the corners of the galleries, while two black cupolas were built above the western part of the cathedral and the domes and roof were covered with copper gilt plates.
The Annunciation Cathedral served as the private chapel of the Moscow great princes and tsars for centuries. After the 1917 Revolution, the cathedral was closed, and the Kremlin Museum took over the care of the cathedral in efforts to preserve and restore its works of art.

Patriarch's Palace 
In 1450, Metropolitan Jonah built the Church of Deposition of the Virgin's Robe, however a fire in 1473 destroyed the entire residence. Pskov architects built a new Church of Deposition of the Virgin's Robe from 1484 to 1485. Another fire in 1626 damaged the Patriarchal Court and restorations began in 1643 at the times of Patriarch Joseph. There were built the Cross, the Golden, the Cell and the Treasury chambers. In its next period of life the Patriarchal Court in the Kremlin was remodeled by Patriarch Nikon until he left. Later Patriarchs reconstructed and decorated the palace in varying degrees. 
When the patriarchates and the institutions of the Holy Synod, the Moscow Synodal Office was located there in the 18th – 19th centuries. It was not until 1918 that the Patriarch's Palace was transferred to the jurisdiction of the museum. Since then, the museum has begun a long process of conservation and restoring the original images. As recent as 2013, several paintings were uncovered from the 17th century.

Church of the Deposition of the Virgin's Robe 
The Church of the Deposition of the Virgin's Robe is between the Assumption Cathedral and the Faceted Chamber. For centuries, the church was part of the metropolitan household and a private chapel for Russian Metropolitans and Patriarchs.

'Ivan the Great' Bell Tower 
The Bell Tower is the focal point of the Kremlin situated between the Cathedral Square and Ivanovskaya Square. The Bell Tower took over three hundred years to complete and consists of the ‘Ivan the Great’ Bell Tower, the Assumption Belfry and the Filaret's Annex. It was built from 1505 to 1508 by Italian architect Bon Fryazin and stands at 81 meters. 
In his retreat from Moscow, Napoleon's Army blew up the bell tower, however it survived and only the Belfry and the Filaret's Annex were destroyed. These were rebuilt to their original dimensions in 1814–1815. The monument of Old Russian architecture houses the museum dedicated to the history of the Moscow Kremlin architectural ensemble.

Outreach 
The Moscow Kremlin Museum and the Kansas International Museum worked together to transport an exhibit to Topeka, KS in 2002. The exhibit “Czars: 400 years of Imperial Grandeur” was going to be on display at the museum in Kansas. The Kremlin leases their exhibits so that people around the world get a chance to view Russian history.

Even within Russia, it is difficult for everyone to visit the Kremlin Museum. The State Historical and Cultural Museum-Reserve and the Primorsky State Museum signed an Agreement of Cooperation in 2018 stating that the Moscow Kremlin Museum would allow the Primorsky State Joint Museum display some of their exhibits for the next five years.

See also 
 List of most visited art museums

References

External links
 Moscow Kremlin Museums Official Site
  Museums Make a Deal
  Moscow Officials Visit America

Art museums and galleries in Moscow
World Heritage Sites in Russia
Moscow Kremlin
Art museums established in 1991